The Ascensor Mariposas is one of the 15 funiculars left in Valparaíso, Chile. Inaugurated in 1906, its route is flanked by houses and shrubs and its upper terminus is a street on the Mariposas Hill. Baquedano street passes over the tracks of the funicular. It was declared as a National Monument of Chile in 1998, within the category of Historic Monuments.

History 
The funicular was inaugurated in 1906. It has the longest route of funicular railways in Valparaíso.

The funicular, along with the Florida and the Monjas, was closed in September 2009 due to very low profit margins or losses generated for its owners.

Since 2012, the Chilean Government is responsible for the maintenance of the funicular, which acquired, along with other nine, for refurbishment purposes and to be put back into operation.

Description 
The lower station of the funicular is located at the western end of Gaspar Marín street, on the plan de Valparaíso. Its upper station faces Paseo Barbosa (Barbosa Promenade), a secondary street of the Mariposas Hill. Its rails rest on the hill supported by railroad ties.

See also
Funicular railway
Funicular railways of Valparaíso
List of funicular railways
Valparaíso

References 

Valparaíso
Funicular railways in Chile
Transport in Valparaíso Region